Demikhovo is a rural locality (a village) in Rozhdestvenskoye Rural Settlement, Sobinsky District, Vladimir Oblast, Russia. The population was 5 as of 2010. There are 2 streets.

Geography 
Demikhovo is located on the Vorsha River, 33 km northwest of Sobinka (the district's administrative centre) by road. Kudelino is the nearest rural locality.

References 

Rural localities in Sobinsky District